Agapema is a subgenus of moths under the genus Saturnia, in the family Saturniidae. Agapema was first described by Berthold Neumoegen and Harrison Gray Dyar Jr. in 1894.

Species
Agapema anona (Ottolengui, 1903) 7754.1
Agapema galbina (Clemens, 1860) 7754
Agapema homogena Dyar, 1908 7756
Agapema solita Ferguson, 1972 7755

References

Saturniinae
Moth genera